This article contains the record of Stade Français Paris rugby union club in championship and cup finals.

French championship

Heineken Cup

European Challenge Cup

Coupe de France

Coupe de l'Espérance

External links
 History on stade.fr

Stade Français